John Erskine Scott Walford (14 August 1899 – 22 August 1961) was an English cricketer. A right-handed batsman and right-arm fast-medium bowler, he played 11 first-class matches between 1923 and 1932, six for Worcestershire and five for the British Army cricket team. He also represented the Egypt national cricket team.

Biography

Born in Hanbury Mount, Worcestershire, Walford made his debut for Worcestershire against Sussex in July 1923, although he did not get to bowl and made only 11 and 5 with the bat. Indeed, he played largely as a batsman that season, bowling only half a dozen overs in five matches and gaining no reward. He did however manage what was to remain his highest score when he hit 31 against Northamptonshire in his second match.

There then followed six years in which Walford played no first-class cricket, before he returned to play for the Army against the RAF at The Oval in July 1930. In the first innings of this match he claimed his first wicket, that of Ronald Sugden, and went on to take five more to finish with what would remain his career best of 6–27. (He also took two wickets in the second innings.)

In the next two years, he played four more times for the Army, and consistently took wickets, a notable performance being his 6–31 against the Marylebone Cricket Club (MCC) in August 1931. He also turned out one more time for Worcestershire, against Nottinghamshire in 1930.

His last first-class match was for the Army against the RAF in June 1932, after which he continued to play at lower levels. He played for the MCC against the Netherlands in 1937 and 1939 and against Ireland in 1939. Earlier that year, he played twice for Egypt against HM Martineau's XI. He died at Ravenscourt Park, Hammersmith, London a few days after his 62nd birthday.

References

1899 births
1961 deaths
People from Wychavon (district)
Egyptian cricketers
English cricketers
Worcestershire cricketers
British Army cricketers
Worcestershire Regiment officers
Royal Electrical and Mechanical Engineers officers
Sportspeople from Worcestershire
Military personnel from Worcestershire